Jesús María is a district of the San Mateo canton, in the Alajuela province of Costa Rica.

History 
Jesús María was created on 31 July 1966 by Ley 3722. Segregated from San Mateo.

Geography 
Jesús María has an area of  km² and an elevation of  metres.

Demographics 

For the 2011 census, Jesús María had a population of  inhabitants.

Transportation

Road transportation 
The district is covered by the following road routes:
 National Route 131

References 

Districts of Alajuela Province
Populated places in Alajuela Province